Infinity is a studio album by jazz trumpeter Tom Harrell, released by HighNote Records in March 2019.

Reception

At DownBeat magazine, Suzanne Lorge highlighted Harrell's sense of form as a composer and improvisation as a musician as two positive aspects. The playing of the sidemen "flows holistically from his writing, with only the slightest of shifts between the composed and improvised sections. These natural transitions speak to a solid group rapport, where the soloists have a stake in the compositional act."

At JazzTimes, David Whiteis wrote, "Harrell sounds both delighted by his musical quest and enraptured by what he discovers. ... [Harrell's] muted trumpet skips with precision, dexterity, and brio, his solos so logically constructed that one could almost believe he's able to fully imagine each note, each run, each statement in its entirety before playing it."

In Jazz Journal, Andy Hamilton gave the album five stars.

Track listing 
All compositions by Tom Harrell
 "The Fast" – 6:38
 "Dublin" – 9:40
 "Hope" – 7:30
 "Coronation" – 6:56
 "Folk Song" – 6:03
 "Blue" – 5:40
 "Ground" – 7:18
 "The Isle" – 8:25
 "Duet" – 1:41
 "Taurus" – 6:01

Personnel 
 Tom Harrell – trumpet, flugelhorn
 Mark Turner – tenor saxophone
 Charles Altura – electric guitar, acoustic guitar
 Ben Street – bass
 Johnathan Blake – drums
 Adam Cruz – percussion

References 

Tom Harrell albums
2019 albums
HighNote Records albums